Olalla may refer to:

Places
Olalla, British Columbia, an unincorporated settlement in the Similkameen Country of the Southern Interior of British Columbia, Canada
Olalla, Washington, an unincorporated settlement on the Kitsap Peninsula in Washington, United States

, locality in Aragon, Spain

People

Given name
Santa Olalla, Galician name for Saint Eulalia of Mérida

Surname
Jesús Olalla (born 1971), Spanish handball player
Julio Olalla (born 1945), former Chilean government lawyer
Milagros Germán Olalla (born 1958), Dominican TV presenter and producer, theatre actress, and the winner of the Miss Dominican Republic 1980 beauty pageant.

Other
Olalla (short story), an 1885 vampire story by Robert Louis Stevenson